Leninist Tendency was a Brazilian organization which split from the Aliança Libertadora Nacional during its 1970-1971 exile, occurring along with other splits such at the Movimento de Libertação Popular (MOLIPO).

References

1970 in Brazil
1971 in Brazil
Guerrilla movements in Latin America
Paramilitary organisations based in Brazil